The Lady may refer to:

The Lady (magazine), England's oldest weekly magazine aimed at women
The Lady (1925 film), a 1925 film directed by Frank Borzage
The Lady (2011 film), a 2011 film about the life of Burmese pro-democracy activist Aung San Suu Kyi
The Lady (Warhammer), a deity in the tabletop game Warhammer, produced by Games Workshop
The Lady of All Nations, a devotional title for Mary, mother of Jesus
Lady of the Lake, several related characters in Arthurian legend
Owain, or the Lady of the Fountain, one of the three Welsh romances (Y Tair Rhamant) associated with the Mabinogion
Aung San Suu Kyi (born 1945), or The Lady, a Burmese politician
 The Lady, the main antagonist of Little Nightmares

See also
Lady (disambiguation)
A Lady (disambiguation)